Bergen Technicial Society (Bergen Teknikersamfund) is a student organization at Western Norway University of Applied Sciences in Bergen, Norway.

Bergen Technicial Society is one of the oldest student organizations in Norway.  It was founded the 21st of November 1877, with the name Regulatoren. At first, it was an organization reserved for engineering students. In recent years, the society has been opened for all students, providing non-curricular activities for students at the University.

References

Other sources
Ertresvaag, Egil  (2002) Bergen teknikersamfund 125 år : jubileumsskrift (Bergen: Høgskolen i Bergen)

External links 
Bergen Teknikersamfund website

Student societies in Norway
Western Norway University of Applied Sciences
1887 establishments in Norway